The 1957-58 Benelux Cup was won by Feijenoord Rotterdam in the final against RSC Anderlecht.

Group stage

Group A

Group B

Final

Benelux Cup
1957–58 in European football